The World's 101 Best Steak Restaurants is a ranking that has been published on an annual basis since 2019 and aims to select the 101 best steak restaurants in the world.

Highly acclaimed and awarded restaurants and chefs like Keens, Gallaghers and Lennox Hastie from Sydney, New York, Buenos Aires and London are part of the ranking.

Management and organisation 
The ranking has been created by the founder Ekkehard Knobelspies and is published by Upper Cut Media House Ltd based in London. All 101 named restaurants are anonymously visited and evaluated once or twice a year on site by the respective steak ambassadors responsible for the individual countries.

Ranking criteria 
The listed restaurants are evaluated using the following criteria:

 Meat quality classified according to taste, terroir, character, marbling, cut, preparation and last but not least tenderness
 Selection of the meat (structured by ageing, origin, breeds) and quantity of steak cuts on the menu. Selection of various primary & secondary cuts
 Service quality and meat expertise of the staff. Staff product knowledge
 Product description of the offered cuts on the menu. (structured by breed, origin, gender, ageing, feeding, slaughtering age and preparation)
 Quality of reservation system and handling of reservations
 Online presence that is appropriate for an international target audience
 Interior design and look and feel of the restaurant

Ranking

Professional steak ambassadors 
2-4 experienced steak ambassadors are employed by the publisher on every continent. The continents where they test and evaluate are:

 North America
 South America
 Europe
 Africa I Middle East
 Asia I Pacific

Incognito restaurant visits and restaurant ratings 
The employed steak ambassadors are visiting the restaurants incognito at least once to evaluate the visited restaurants. Final decisions about the admission in the ranking are made by the regional executive teams.

References

External links 
Official Website

Food and drink awards